is a Japanese manga series by YUUKI HB. It has been serialized online via Suiseisha' Screamo website since June 2021. It has been collected in two tankōbon volumes. An anime television series adaptation by Studio Hōkiboshi aired from October to December 2022.

Characters

Media

Manga
The manga focuses on veteran solo camper Kensuke forming a camping group with four girls.

Anime
An anime television series adaptation by Studio Hōkiboshi aired from October 2 to December 5, 2022. It is directed by Toshihiro Watase and written by Eeyo Kurosaki, with Kazuya Kuroda as character designer and chief animation director.

References

External links
  
 

Anime series based on manga
Camping in anime and manga
Harem anime and manga
Seinen manga
Tokyo MX original programming